Baadada Hoo is a 1982 Kannada-language film directed by K. V. Jayaram and produced by K. S. Narayan. The story is based on the novel of the same name written by Saisuthe. The film stars Anant Nag, Padmapriya and K. S. Ashwath.

The film's score and  songs were composed by Ashwath-Vaidi and it fetched the Third Best Film award at the Karnataka State Film Awards for the year 1981–82. The performance of the lead roles played by Anant Nag and Padmapriya were praised by the critics as well as audience. It was one of the best movies of Padmapriya.

Cast 
 Anant Nag 
 Padmapriya (voice dubbed by B. Jayashree)
 K. S. Ashwath 
 Loknath
 Shivaram
 Dingri Nagaraj
 Advani Lakshmi Devi
 Uma Shivakumar
 Sudharani (Child artiste)
 Mandeep Roy
 Ramakrishna in a cameo

Soundtrack 
The music was composed by the Ashwath - Vaidi duo, with lyrics by Chi. Udaya Shankar and Prof. Doddarangegowda.

Awards
 Karnataka State Award for Third Best Film

References 

1982 films
1980s Kannada-language films
Indian romance films
Films based on Indian novels
Films scored by C. Ashwath
Films scored by L. Vaidyanathan
1980s romance films